Governorate or provincial elections were scheduled to be held in Iraq on 20 April 2020, to replace the provincial councils in the governorates of Iraq that were elected in the 2013 Iraqi governorate elections and, in Kurdistan Region, in the 2014 elections. The elections were delayed indefinitely in November 2019, amidst demonstrations demanding the end of the existing political system. In the summer of 2020, after protests around the country specifically demanded the dissolution of provincial administrations, the ruling parties decided to postpone any decision on when to hold new provincial elections until after the early parliamentary election planned for October 2021.

See also 

 Kurdistani Coalition

References